Stephan Pappas (born December 14, 1950) is an American politician and a Republican member of the Wyoming State Senate, representing the 7th district since January 5, 2015.

Elections

2014
Incumbent Republican State Senator Leslie Nutting retired after serving one term. Pappas ran unopposed in the Republican primary, and defeated Democratic nominee Dameione Cameron, 59% to 41%. He took office on January 5, 2015.

Early life and education

Pappas was born in Cheyenne, Wyoming, in 1950, the son of Theoni B; (Harrison) and Andrew S. Pappas. He is of Greek descent. He graduated from East High School in Cheyenne, WY in 1969. He then attended the University of New Mexico where he obtained a bachelor's degree in fine arts in 1973. He continued his education at the University of Arizona obtaining a Bachelors of Architecture degree in 1978.

References

External links
Official page at the Wyoming Legislature
Profile at Ballotpedia

1950 births
Living people
Republican Party Wyoming state senators
University of New Mexico alumni
Arizona State University alumni
21st-century American politicians
American people of Greek descent